Thornby may refer to:

Thornby, Cumbria
Thornby, Northamptonshire